Cheshmeh Tala may refer to:

Cheshmeh Tala, Khorramabad
Cheshmeh Tala, Selseleh